The 89th Pennsylvania House of Representatives District is located in South Central Pennsylvania and has been represented by Rob Kauffman since 2005.

District profile
The 89th District is located in Franklin County and includes the following areas: 

 Chambersburg
 Greene Township
Guilford Township
Hamilton Township

Representatives

References

Government of Franklin County, Pennsylvania
89